The Napoleonic era is a period in the history of France and Europe. It is generally classified as including the fourth and final stage of the French Revolution, the first being the National Assembly, the second being the Legislative Assembly, and the third being the Directory. The Napoleonic era begins roughly with Napoleon Bonaparte's coup d'état, overthrowing the Directory (9 November 1799), establishing the French Consulate, and ends during the Hundred Days and his defeat at the Battle of Waterloo (18 June 1815). The Congress of Vienna soon set out to restore Europe to pre-French Revolution days. Napoleon brought political stability to a land torn by revolution and war. He made peace with the Roman Catholic Church and reversed the most radical religious policies of the Convention. In 1804 Napoleon promulgated the Civil Code, a revised body of civil law, which also helped stabilize French society. The Civil Code affirmed the political and legal equality of all adult men and established a merit-based society in which individuals advanced in education and employment because of talent rather than birth or social standing. The Civil Code confirmed many of the moderate revolutionary policies of the National Assembly but retracted measures passed by the more radical Convention. The code restored patriarchal authority in the family, for example, by making women and children subservient to male heads of households.

Whilst working to stabilise France, Napoleon also sought to extend his authority throughout Europe. Napoleon's armies conquered the Iberian and Italian peninsulas, occupied lands, and he forced Austria, Prussia, and Russia to ally with him and respect French hegemony in Europe. The United Kingdom refused to recognise French hegemony and continued the war throughout.

The First French Empire began to unravel in 1812, when he decided to invade Russia. Napoleon underestimated the difficulties his army would have to face whilst occupying Russia. Convinced that the Tsar was conspiring with his British enemies, Napoleon led an army of 600,000 soldiers to Moscow. He defeated the Russian army at Borodino before capturing Moscow, but the Tsar withdrew and Moscow was set ablaze, leaving Napoleon's vast army without adequate shelter or supplies. Napoleon ordered a retreat, but the bitter Russian winter  and repeated Russian attacks whittled down his army, and only a battered remnant of 30,000 soldiers managed to limp back to French territory. The allies then continued a united effort against Napoleon until they had seized Paris forcing his abdication in 1814. His return to power the next year was resisted by all the allies and his army was defeated by a Prussian and Anglo-Allied force at Waterloo.

Rulers
Heads and leaders of states affected by Napoleon's regime and the Napoleonic wars:

 Austria
 Archduchy of Austria: Francis II (1792–1835)
 Austrian Empire: Francis I (1804–1835)
 Confederation of the Rhine: Protector Napoleon I (1806–1813)
 Denmark–Norway: Christian VII (1766–1808), Frederick VI (Regent 1772–1808, King of Denmark 1808–1839, King of Norway 1808–1814)
 Duchy of Warsaw: Frederick Augustus I of Saxony, by personal arrangement with Napoleon, partial liberation (1806–1815) of the former Commonwealth of Poland–Lithuania
 Egypt: Muhammad Ali (1805–1848)
 Etruria: Louis (1801–03), Charles Louis (1803–1807)
 France
 French Republic: First Consul Napoleon Bonaparte (1799–1804)
 French Empire: Napoleon I (1804–1814, 1815)
 Kingdom of France: Louis XVIII (1814–15, 1815–1824)
 Great Britain
 Kingdom of Great Britain: King George III (1760–1801), Prime Minister William Pitt the Younger (1793–1801)
 United Kingdom of Great Britain and Ireland: King George III (1801–1820); Prince Regent George (1811–1820); Prime Ministers William Pitt the Younger (1801, 1804–06), Henry Addington (1801–04), The Lord Grenville (1806–07), The Duke of Portland (1807–09), Spencer Perceval (1809–1812), The Earl of Liverpool (1812–1827)
 Haiti: Jean-Jacques Dessalines (as Governor-General 1804, as Emperor Jacques I 1804–06), Henri Christophe (as President 1806–1811, as King Henri I 1811–1820)
 Holland: Louis I (1806–10), Louis II (1810)
 Holy Roman Empire: Francis II (1792–1806)
 Italy: Napoleon I (1805–1814)
 Naples: Ferdinand IV (1799–1806, 1815–16), Joseph Bonaparte (1806–08), Joachim Murat (1808–1815)
 Netherlands: William I (1815–1840)
 Montenegro: Petar I Petrović-Njegoš (1782–1830)
 Ottoman Empire: Selim III (1789–1807), Mustafa IV (1807–08), Mahmud II (1808–1839)
 Papal States: Pius VII (1800–1823)
 Portugal: Mary I (1777–1816), John VI (Regent 1799–1816, King 1816–1826)
 Prussia: Frederick William III (1797–1840)
 Russian Empire: Paul I (1796–1801), Alexander I (1801–1825)
 Sardinia: Charles Emmanuel IV (1796–1802), Victor Emmanuel I (1802–1821)
 Saxony: Frederick Augustus I (1763–1827)
 Serbia
 Revolutionary Serbia was in a state of rebellion against the Ottoman rule, de facto independent, led initially Karađorđe 1804–1813 who was succeeded by Miloš Obrenović from 1815 onwards.
 Sicily: Ferdinand III (1759–1816)
 Spain: Charles IV (1788–1808), Ferdinand VII (1808, 1813–1833), Joseph I (1808–1813)
 Sweden: Gustav IV Adolf (1792–1809), Charles XIII (1809–1818)
 United States: Presidents John Adams (1797–1801), Thomas Jefferson (1801–1809), James Madison (1809–1817)
 Württemberg: Frederick I (1797–1816)

Wars
French Revolutionary Wars (1792–1802)
Egyptian Campaign (1798–1801)
War of the Second Coalition (1799–1802)
Napoleonic Wars (1803–1815)
War of the Third Coalition (1805)
War of the Fourth Coalition (1806–1807)
Gunboat War (1807–1814)
Peninsular War (1808–1814)
War of the Fifth Coalition (1809)
French invasion of Russia (1812)
War of the Sixth Coalition (1812–1814)
Hundred Days (1815)
 Russo-Turkish War (1806–1812)
 Anglo-Turkish War (1807–1809)
 Anglo-Russian War (1807–1812)
 Finnish War (1808–1809)
 War of 1812 (1812–1815)
 Swedish-Norwegian War (1814)

Major battles
Battle of Marengo – 14 June 1800
Battle of Abukir – 8 March 1801
Battle of Alexandria -21 March 1801
Battle of Copenhagen – 2 April 1801
Battle of Trafalgar – 21 October 1805
Battle of Austerlitz – 2 December 1805
Battle of Jena-Auerstedt – 14 October 1806
Battle of Eylau – 7–8 February 1807
Battle of Friedland – 14 June 1807
Battle of Vimeiro – 21 August 1808
Battle of Somosierra – 30 November 1808
Battle of Eckmühl – 21–22 April 1809
Battle of Aspern-Essling – 21–22 May 1809
Battle of Wagram – 5–6 July 1809
Battle of Talavera – 27–28 July 1809
Battle of Salamanca – 22 July 1812
Battle of Borodino – 7 September 1812
Battle of Lützen – 2 May 1813
Battle of Bautzen – 20–21 May 1813
Battle of Vitoria – 21 June 1813
Battle of Dresden – 26–27 August 1813
Battle of Leipzig – 16–19 October 1813
Battle of Paris – 30–31 March 1814
Battle of Waterloo – 18 June 1815

See also
First Empire: The International Magazine for the Napoleonic Enthusiast, Historian, and Gamer (magazine)

References

The Napoleonic era at Britannica

Napoleon
First French Empire
French Revolution
Modern history of France
Historical eras